The SK Telecom Open is an annual professional golf tournament hosted in South Korea and sponsored by the Korean cell phone company SK Telecom. The tournament was inaugurated in June 1997 as "SK Telecom Classic", and renamed in 2001. It is part of the Korean Tour for men, and was co-sanctioned by the Asian Tour from 2001 to 2007. It was co-sanctioned by the OneAsia Tour from 2010 to 2015. Since 2017 it has had prize money of ₩1,200,000,000.

The tenth edition, held 4–7 May 2006, was shortened to 54 holes because of rain. The tournament that year made international headlines when teenage golfer Michelle Wie made the cut, only the second female golfer to do so in a Korean men's tournament after Se Ri Pak in 2003 and the first to do it in an Asian Tour tournament.

It has been staged at five different venues since its inception: Pinx Golf Club, Sky 72 Golf Club, BA Vista, IIdong Lake and the Lakeside Golf Clubs.

Winners

Source:

Notes

References

External links
 

Korean Tour events
Former Asian Tour events
Golf tournaments in South Korea
Recurring sporting events established in 1997
Spring (season) events in South Korea
1997 establishments in South Korea